KOHC-CD, virtual channel 45 (UHF digital channel 31), is a low-powered, Class A Visión Latina-owned-and-operated television station licensed to Oklahoma City, Oklahoma, United States. The station is owned by HC2 Station Group, Inc. KOHC-CD maintains studios located near Northwest 38th Street and MacArthur Boulevard in Warr Acres, and its transmitter is located near Southeast 104th Street and South Bryant Avenue in south Oklahoma City (on the city limits of Moore). The station is available on Cox Communications digital cable channel 22/438 and AT&T U-verse channel 38.

History

The station first signed on the air on August 29, 1986, broadcasting on VHF channel 7; it initially operated as an independent station, and was known to carry ethnic-oriented programs during the station's first seven years on the air, including those that catered to Native American audiences and Asian language speakers. In 2000, the station moved to UHF channel 38.

KOHC affiliated with Azteca América in late 2007 and adopted an all-Spanish language format. The station relocated to channel 45 in 2009. On August 13, 2012, KOHC-CD changed its primary affiliation to upstart Spanish language network MundoFox, relegating Azteca América programming to a second digital subchannel and eliminating Retro TV and AMGTV from its digital signal, which in effect resulted in the station being affiliated only with Spanish language broadcast networks (besides Azteca and MundoFox, the two additional subchannels that remained after the removal of the Retro TV and AMGTV subchannels were Mexicanal and TeLe-Romántica). In January 2013, MundoFox was moved to digital channel 45.2, while the Azteca América affiliation reverted to the station's main channel.

Digital channels
The station's digital signal is multiplexed:

References

External links

OHC-CD
Spanish-language television stations in Oklahoma
Television channels and stations established in 1986
Low-power television stations in the United States